Melvin Alusa is a Kenyan actor and commercial model who has been featured on a number of local and international films including Mission to Rescue, Big Brother Africa, The Boy Who Harnessed the Wind.

Career 
Melvin acting career features both stage and screen acting. He has been featured in shows such as Crime and Justice.

Personal life 
Melvin Alusa was born in Nairobi, Kenya. His younger brother is the musician Bien_Aime. 

He has six children.

Awards 
Best Actor, Mission to Rescue - Zanzibar International Film Festival (ZIFF) 2021

References 

Kenyan male film actors
Male models